The UK Singles Chart is one of many music charts compiled by the Official Charts Company that calculates the best-selling singles of the week in the United Kingdom. Since 2004 the chart has been based on the sales of both physical singles and digital downloads, with airplay figures excluded from the official chart. Since 2014, the singles chart has been based on both sales and streaming, with the ratio altered in 2017 to 150:1 streams and only three singles by the same artist eligible for the chart. From July 2018, video streams from YouTube Music and Spotify among others began to be counted for the Official Charts. This list shows singles that peaked in the Top 10 of the UK Singles Chart during 2023, as well as singles which peaked in 2022 and 2024 but were in the top 10 in 2023. The entry date is when the song appeared in the top 10 for the first time (week ending, as published by the Official Charts Company, which is six days after the chart is announced).

Thirty-five singles have been in the top 10 so far this year (as of 30 March 2023, week ending). Fifteen singles from 2022 remained in the top 10 for several weeks at the beginning of the year. "Calm Down" by Rema, "Escapism" by Raye, "Merry Christmas" by Ed Sheeran and Elton John, "Rockin' Around the Christmas Tree" by Brenda Lee, "It's Beginning to Look a Lot Like Christmas" by Michael Bublé, "Firebabe" by Stormzy and "Let Go" by Central Cee were the singles from 2022 to reach their peak in 2023. Bugzy Malone, Miguel, PinkPantheress, Coi Leray and Lizzy McAlpine are among the many artists who have achieved their first top 10 single so far in 2023.

"Last Christmas" by Wham!, originally released in 1984, returned to the top of the chart in the first week of 2023. The first new number-one single of the year was "Escapism" by Raye featuring 070 Shake. Overall, three different songs have peaked at number-one so far in 2023, with three unique artists hitting that position.

An asterisk (*) in the "Weeks in Top 10" column shows that the song is currently in the top 10.

Background

Multiple entries
Thirty-five singles have charted in the top 10 so far in 2023 (as of 30 March 2023, week ending), with twenty-seven singles reaching their peak so far this year (including the re-entries "Rockin' Around the Christmas Tree" and "It's Beginning to Look a Lot Like Christmas", which charted in previous years but reached peaks on their latest chart run).

Miley Cyrus achieves a streaming career best and prestigious Chart Double
On 20 January 2023 (26 January 2023, week ending), Miley Cyrus debuted at number-one in the UK Singles Chart with "Flowers", which became her third number-one, and her first since "Wrecking Ball" topped the charts in October 2013. "Flowers" boasted 92,000 chart units and exceeded 9.9 million streams, Cyrus' biggest number in its first week. It was also the UK's largest first week activity since "As It Was" by Harry Styles in April 2022. Cyrus went on to achieve the prestigious Chart Double for the second time in her career in March 2023 when during the song's ninth week at number one, the album Endless Summer Vacation debuted at the top of the UK Albums Chart, ten years after this was achieved when Bangerz and "Wrecking Ball" topped both the albums and singles charts, respectively.

Miguel earns chart success with sleeper hit
On 27 January 2023 (2 February 2023, week ending), Miguel entered the top 10 of the UK Singles Chart at number 10 with "Sure Thing", which gave the American singer his first UK top 10 hit. Originally released in 2010, the song saw a resurgence in popularity worldwide in late 2022, due to a viral dance trend on TikTok. It eventually peaked at number 4 on 10 February 2023 (16 February 2023, week ending).

Chart debuts
Ten artists have achieved their first charting top 10 single in 2023, either as a lead or featured artist (as of 23 March 2023, week ending).

The following table (collapsed on desktop site) does not include acts who had previously charted as part of a group and secured their first top 10 solo single.

Notes
Despite being considered a Christmas Standard, "Jingle Bell Rock" entered the top-ten for the first time in January 2023 becoming Helms' first top-ten single.

Top-ten singles
Key

Entries by artist

The following table shows artists who have achieved two or more top 10 entries in 2023, including singles that reached their peak in 2022. The figures include both main artists and featured artists, while appearances on ensemble charity records are also counted for each artist. The total number of weeks an artist spent in the top ten in 2023 is also shown.

Notes

 "All I Want for Christmas Is You" re-entered the top 10 at number 8 on 8 December 2022 (week ending). The song originally peaked at number 2 upon its initial release in 1994 and reached number-one for the first time ever on 17 December 2020 (week ending).
 "Last Christmas" re-entered the top 10 at number 9 on 9 December 2022 (week ending). The song originally peaked at number 2 upon its initial release in 1984 and reached number-one for the first time ever on 7 January 2021 (week ending).
 "Merry Christmas" re-entered the top 10 at number 4 on 15 December 2022 (week ending), having originally peaked at number-one upon release in 2021.
 "Rockin' Around the Christmas Tree" re-entered the top 10 at number 6 on 15 December 2022 (week ending). Having originally number 6 upon its original release in 1962, the song reached a new peak of number 4 on 5 January 2023 (week ending).
 "It's Beginning to Look a Lot Like Christmas" re-entered the top 10 at number 10 on 15 December 2022 (week ending). Having first peaked inside the top 10 at number 7 in 2018, the song reached a new peak of number 6 on 5 January 2023 (week ending).
 "Fairytale of New York" re-entered the top 10 at number 9 on 22 December 2022 (week ending), having originally peaked at number 2 upon release in 1987.
 "It's Beginning to Look A lot Like Christmas" re-entered the top 10 at number 6 on 5 January 2023 (week ending).
 "Fairytale of New York" re-entered the top 10 at number 9 on 5 January 2023 (week ending).
 "It's the Most Wonderful Time of the Year" first charted at number 21 in 2007, and reached the top 10 for the first time on 6 January 2022 (week ending), peaking at number 9.
 "Escapism" re-entered the top 10 at number-one on 12 January 2023 (week ending).
 "Anti-Hero" re-entered the top 10 at number 2 on 12 January 2023 (week ending).
 "Messy in Heaven" re-entered the top 10 at number 3 on 12 January 2023 (week ending).
 "Made You Look" re-entered the top 10 at number 5 on 12 January 2023 (week ending).
 "Let Go" re-entered the top 10 at number 6 on 12 January 2023 (week ending).
 "Miss You" re-entered the top 10 at number 7 on 12 January 2023 (week ending).
 "Calm Down" re-entered the top 10 at number 8 on 12 January 2023 (week ending).
 "Another Love" re-entered the top 10 at number 10 on 12 January 2023 (week ending), having originally peaked at number 10 upon release in 2013.
 "Miss You" re-entered the top 10 at number 10 on 9 February 2023 (week ending).
 "Boy's a Liar" entered the top 10 at number 8 on 16 February 2023 (week ending), following the release of the subsequent Boy's a Liar Pt. 2 remix featuring Ice Spice.
 "As It Was" re-entered the top 10 at number 7 on 23 February 2023 (week ending), following Styles' success and performance of the song at the Brit Awards 2023.
 "10:35" re-entered the top 10 at number 8 on 2 March 2023 (week ending).
 "Die for You" entered the top 10 at number 4 on 9 March 2023 (week ending), following the release of the subsequent remix featuring Ariana Grande, and the song's resurgence in popularity on social media app TikTok.

References

External links 
2023 singles chart archive at the Official Charts Company (click on relevant week)

United Kingdom top 10 singles
Top 10 singles
2023